John Ellis Bowlt (born 1943) is an English art historian specialising in Russian avant garde art of 1900-1930. He is a professor at the University of Southern California and directs its Institute of Modern Russian Culture.

In 2009, Bowlt received the Order of Friendship from former Russian President Dmitry Medvedev. He has received numerous awards and scholarships, including the Woodrow Wilson National Fellowship and Fulbright-Hays Awards.

Selected publications
Russian Art of the Avant-Garde: Theory and Criticism 1902–1934. Thames and Hudson, London, 1988. (Documents of Twentieth-Century Art)
Amazons of the Avant-Garde. Guggenheim Museum, 2000. (With Matthew Drutt)
Masterpieces of Russian Stage Design: 1880–1930. Antique Collectors Club, 2012.
Kazimir Malevich, 1878–1935. University of Washington Press, 1991.

References 

1943 births
Living people
Academics from London
English art historians
University of Southern California faculty
Historians of Russia
British expatriates in the United States
Slade Professors of Fine Art (University of Cambridge)